The 2019–20 Old Dominion Monarchs women's basketball team represented Old Dominion University during the 2019–20 NCAA Division I women's basketball season. The team was led by third-year head coach Nikki McCray-Penson, and played their home games at Chartway Arena in Norfolk, Virginia as a member of Conference USA. The Monarchs finished second overall in their conference but could not compete in the 2020 C-USA women's basketball tournament due to its cancellation as a result of the coronavirus pandemic.

Roster

Schedule and results

|-
!colspan=12 style=|Non-conference regular season

|-
!colspan=12 style=|C-USA regular season

|-
!colspan=12 style=| C-USA Tournament

See also
 2019–20 Old Dominion Monarchs men's basketball team

Notes

References 

Old Dominion Monarchs women's basketball seasons
Old Dominion
Old Dominion Lady Monarchs basketball team
Old Dominion Lady Monarchs basketball team
Conference USA women's basketball tournament